Dominik Bernard, born in Pointe-à-Pitre, is a French stage and film actor and a director of Guadeloupean origin. He is also the French voice for many American actors, such as Dwayne "The Rock" Johnson, Courtney B. Vance, Dennis Haysbert, Jeffrey Wright and Chiwetel Ejiofor.

Life and career

Selected filmography

Music video appearances

Stage

Actor

Stage director

Voxography

French voices

French Radio dramas

References

External links 

 
  Dominik Bernard on Africultures
  Dominik Bernard on Les Archives du Spectacle

Living people
People from Pointe-à-Pitre
Guadeloupean people
French people of Guadeloupean descent
Guadeloupean actors
French male film actors
French male stage actors
French male television actors
French male voice actors
French television presenters
Year of birth missing (living people)